This is a List of sports venues with the name Toyota.

Sports venues with Toyota naming rights
 Town Toyota Center, Wenatchee, Washington
 Toyota Center, Houston, Texas
 Toyota Center, Kennewick, Washington
 Toyota Field, San Antonio, Texas
 Findlay Toyota Center, Prescott Valley, Arizona
 Toyota Sports Center, El Segundo, California
 Toyota Stadium, Georgetown, Kentucky 
 Toyota Stadium, Frisco, Texas
 Toyota Stadium, Fenton, Missouri
Toyota Arena, Ontario, California

Former venues with Toyota naming rights:
 Toyota Arena, Prague, Czech Republic
 Toyota Arena, York, Pennsylvania
 Toyota Field (aka Toyota Stadium, and Toyota Park), Woolooware, New South Wales
 Toyota Speedway at Irwindale, Irwindale, California
 Toyota Park, Bridgeview, Illinois

Sports venues named after Toyota, Aichi, Japan
The following are all located in the city of Toyota and are named after the municipality, without naming rights to the brand. Meanwhile, the city itself is named after the company.
 Toyota Stadium
 Toyota Athletic Stadium
 Toyota Baseball Field

See also
 List of sponsored sports venues
 List of sports venues named after individuals
 List of cultural entities with sole naming rights
Sports venues
Toyota
Toyota
Naming in sports
Toyota in motorsport